Ariane Rinehart (born April 13, 1994) is an American actress and singer. She is best known for her performance in The Sound of Music Live! as the eldest von Trapp daughter, Liesl, which was described by critics as the standout performance in the production.

Early life and education

Rinehart was born to plastic surgeon Gregory Rinehart and illustrator Nadine Sokol Rinehart. Rinehart has an older brother, Ian. Rinehart started with ballet as an extra activity to do, but soon developed a love for it. She then started taking voice and acting lessons. Rinehart's first role was in Rodger and Hammerstein's Carousel.

Rinehart attended Lindbergh High School in St. Louis, Missouri, and earned a Bachelor of Arts degree from Barnard College, where she majored in sociology and minored in German.

Career
When she was 10 years old, Rinehart starred as Marta, the second youngest Von Trapp, in a professional production of the Sound of Music in St. Louis. This was a precursor to her second role in The Sound of Music in 2013, which was watched by 18 million people on NBC. It was the first full-scale musical made for TV and performed live since 1957.

As part of the promotion for The Sound of Music Live! she performed one of the songs live in the 2013 Macy's Thanksgiving Day Parade. Rinehart also reunited with the other Von Trapp children in December 2014 at 54 Below for a concert to promote the re-airing of The Sound of Music Live!. She has had several other film and television roles, and starred in the Justin Timberlake music video for the song "Mirrors". She appeared as Eve in the film Noah, released on March 28, 2014. In 2016, Rinehart appeared in episodes of Quantico and Blue Bloods, and 2017 in Law & Order: Special Victims Unit and What Would You Do?.

Filmography

Film

Television

References

External links
 
 NBC biography of Rinehart

Living people
Actresses from St. Louis
American film actresses
21st-century American actresses
Actresses from New York City
Barnard College alumni
1994 births
21st-century American singers
Singers from New York City
Musicians from St. Louis
Singers from Missouri